The Sejm of the Republic of Poland (Polish: Sejm Rzeczypospolitej Polskiej) is the lower house of the Polish parliament. Its name comes from what was once a generic Polish word for a political gathering. It is also used to refer to historical diets or assemblies.

Pre-partition sejms 
 Sejm of the Kingdom of Poland, 15th–16th centuries
 Sejm of the Polish–Lithuanian Commonwealth, 1569–1793
 Sejm of Four Lands, or Council of Four Lands (Sejm Czterech Ziem, Va'ad Arba' Aratzot), central Jewish authority in Poland, 1580–1764

Types of sessions 
 Confederated sejm (sejm skonfederowany), a form of sejm where decisions were made by the majority of deputy votes cast  
 Convocation sejm (sejm konwokacyjny), part of the process of royal elections in which candidates were put forward and rules of election established
 Coronation sejm (sejm koronacyjny), the first sejm convened by a newly crowned king
 Election sejm (sejm elekcyjny), the election of the king by the nobility
 Pacification sejm (Sejm pacyfikacyjny), held after a period of conflict, usually a disputed royal election, to bring peace and unity to the country

Specific sessions 
In chronological order:
 Convocation Sejm (1764)
 Election Sejm of 1632
 Silent Sejm (Sejm Niemy), 1717
 Repnin Sejm (Sejm Repninowski), 1767–1768
 Partition Sejm (Sejm Rozbiorowy), 1773–1775
 Great Sejm (Sejm Wielki), 1788–1792
 Grodno Sejm (Sejm Grodzieński), 1793

Post-partition sejms 
In chronological order:
 Galician Sejm (Sejm Galicyjski, Sejm Krajowy), or Diet of Galicia and Lodomeria, 1861–1918
 Silesian Sejm, or Silesian Parliament (Sejm Śląski), legislature of the Autonomous Silesian Voivodeship, 1920–1939
 Sejm of the Republic of Central Lithuania (Sejm Litwy Środkowej), 1922
 Contract Sejm (sejm kontraktowy), 1989–1991

See also 
 Saeima, the parliament of Latvia
 Seimas, the parliament of Lithuania
 Seym River, a river in Russia and Ukraine spelled "Sejm" in Polish